Sabuana is a village in Khurrianwala, Faisalabad, Pakistan.  The majority of residents are Rajputs.

Industries
Textile industries in the area include Kamal Group, Bismillah Textile, Ahmad Jamal Limited, Gohar Textile Mills, Chawla Enterprises and Nimra Textile.

Sports
Cricket, football (soccer), kabaddi, cockfighting, and pigeon flying are popular games in Sabuana.
Parwaz Cricket Club is Regtd. Team of Sabuana.

Religious Places
Darbar Peer Ata Muhammad Shah ,
Darbar Peer Mubarak Ali shah

See also
Khurrianwala

References

Villages in Faisalabad District